Saji may refer to:

 Saji, Tottori,  a Japanese village
 Saji Observatory, an astronomical observatory in Japan
 8738 Saji, a main-belt asteroid, named after the Japanese Saji Observatory

People 
 Alia Al-Saji, associate professor of philosophy at McGill University, Canada
 Keizo Saji (1919–1999), Japanese businessman and art patron
 Nobutada Saji (born 1945), Japanese businessman
 Saji Kazunari (1569–1634), Japanese samurai warrior 
 Saji Paravoor (aka Sanjeev N. R), Indian Malayalam film director
 Saji Surendran, Indian film director in Malayalam films
 Saji Thomas (fl. 2018), Indian rower